Qazi Rural District is a rural district (dehestan) in Samalqan District, Maneh and Samalqan County, North Khorasan Province, Iran. At the 2006 census, its population was 10,734, in 2,812 families.  The rural district has 12 villages.

References 

Rural Districts of North Khorasan Province
Maneh and Samalqan County